Trevor Senior (born 28 November 1961) is a former professional footballer who played as a striker, primarily at Reading. He is the assistant manager of Dorchester Town.

Playing career
Senior was born in Stratton, near Dorchester, Dorset. He started his career at Dorchester Town. He joined Portsmouth in 1981 for £35,000, and then (after a loan spell with Aldershot) moved to Reading where he scored 184 goals in 362 league and cup appearances in two spells between 1983 and 1992. In season 1983–84, when Reading won promotion from the Fourth Division, Senior was top scorer in all four divisions of the Football League with 36 goals in the league and a total of 41 in all competitions. Two years later he scored 27 times in the Third Division campaign as Reading won another promotion, this time as champions of their division.

In March 1988 Senior signed for Middlesbrough on transfer deadline day for a fee of £200,000 from Watford, where he had moved in July 1987. After making just ten league appearances for Boro and being part of their Second Division promotion winning team, Senior moved back to Reading in October 1988. Despite his time on Teesside being seen generally as a disappointment, Senior was instrumental in Boro's promotion in May 1988 after scoring two important goals in the play-offs.

After he left Reading for a second time in 1992, and making his last Football League appearance at the age of 30, Senior spent a season with non-league Woking, and then a short spell at Dorchester Town before signing in November 1993 for Farnborough Town.

Managerial and coaching career
The following season Senior became manager of Weymouth and subsequently during 1995–96 had another spell at Farnborough. His last job was manager of Bridgwater Town in the Western Football League, before joining Dorchester, and becoming the Under 18's manager. His last game as U-18's manager was in May 2008

Senior was appointed manager of Western League Division One Bridport on 15 June 2009 following the resignation of Ian Hutchinson.

References

Living people
1961 births
People from West Dorset District
Footballers from Dorset
English footballers
Association football forwards
English Football League players
Dorchester Town F.C. players
Portsmouth F.C. players
Aldershot F.C. players
Reading F.C. players
Watford F.C. players
Middlesbrough F.C. players
Woking F.C. players
Farnborough F.C. players
English football managers
Weymouth F.C. managers
Bridport F.C. managers
Bashley F.C. managers
Bridgwater Town F.C. managers
Outfield association footballers who played in goal